Santo Antônio de Lisboa or Santo António de Lisboa generally refers to Anthony of Padua, also known as Saint Anthony of Lisbon 

Santo Antônio de Lisboa may also refer to:
Santo Antônio de Lisboa, Piauí, a municipality in the state of Piauí, Brazil
Santo Antônio de Lisboa, Santa Catarina - a district in the city of Florianópolis, Santa Catarina, Brazil

See also
Santo Antônio (disambiguation)